Laprairie—Napierville was a federal electoral district in Quebec, Canada, that was represented in the House of Commons of Canada from 1896 to 1935.

This riding was created in 1892 from Laprairie and Napierville ridings. It consisted initially of:
 the villages of Laprairie, St. Rémi and Napierville, and
 the parishes de Laprairie, St. Constant, St. Isidore, St. Jacques le Mineur, St. Philippe, St. Michel Archange, St. Patrice de Sherrington, St. Édouard, St. Cyprien and St. Rémi.

In 1903, the Indian village and reserve of Caughnawaga were transferred from Châteauguay riding into Laprairie—Napierville.

In 1924, it was defined to consist of the Counties of Laprairie and Napierville.

It was abolished in 1933 when it was redistributed into Beauharnois—Laprairie and St. Johns—Iberville—Napierville ridings.

Members of Parliament

This riding elected the following Members of Parliament:

Election results

By-election: On Mr. Lanctôt's death, 30 May 1929

See also 

 List of Canadian federal electoral districts
 Past Canadian electoral districts

External links
Riding history from the Library of Parliament

Former federal electoral districts of Quebec